The 2015–16 Liga Profesional de Primera División season, also known as the 2015–16 Copa Uruguaya or the 2015–16 Campeonato Uruguayo, was the 112th season of Uruguay's top-flight football league, and the 85th in which it was professional. Nacional was the defending champion.

Attendances

The teams with an average home attendance above 10,000 were Club Nacional de Football with 15,065 and Peñarol with 14,172.

Teams

Torneo Apertura

Standings

Torneo Clausura

Standings

Aggregate table

Relegation

Championship playoff

Semifinal

Final
Since Peñarol, who has the best record in the aggregate table, won the semifinal, they became champions automatically, and the final was not played. Nacional became runners-up as the second-placed team in the aggregate table.

References

External links
Asociación Uruguaya de Fútbol - Campeonato Uruguayo 
Tournament regulations 

2015-16
1
2015 in South American football leagues
2016 in South American football leagues